The term upstate may refer to the northerly portions of several U.S. states. On the east coast, upstate generally refers to places away from the Atlantic Ocean. It also can refer to parts of states that have a higher elevation, away from sea level. These regions tend to be rural; exceptions include Delaware and Illinois.

 Places
 Maine, except for "Down East"
 Upstate California, a 2001 marketing campaign to promote the northern half of Northern California
 Upstate New York, an area of New York north of the New York City metropolitan area
 Upstate South Carolina, the northwestern "corner" of South Carolina
 Upstate Virginia
 Upstate Pennsylvania, a tourism region that includes much of Northeastern Pennsylvania
 Other
 SUNY Upstate Medical University, often referred to as "Upstate"
 Upstate University Hospital, Syracuse, New York
 A term used to refer to going to the penitentiary in New York, as all of New York's state prisons are upstate.

See also 
 Articles beginning with "Upstate"
 Downstate (disambiguation)

Regions of the United States
Geography terminology
Geography of the United States